Stellar molecules are molecules that exist or form in stars. Such formations can take place when the temperature is low enough for molecules to form – typically around 6000 K or cooler. Otherwise the stellar matter is restricted to atoms (chemical elements) in the forms of gas or – at very high temperatures – plasma.

Background
Matter is made up by atoms (formed by protons and other subatomic particles). When the environment is right, atoms can join together and form molecules, which give rise to most materials studied in materials science. But certain environments, such as high temperatures, don't allow atoms to form molecules. Stars have very high temperatures, primarily in their interior, and therefore there are few molecules formed in stars. For this reason, a typical chemist (who studies atoms and molecules) would not have much to study in a star, so stars are better explained by astrophysicists or astrochemists. However, low abundance of molecules in stars is not equated with no molecules at all.

By the mid-18th century, scientists surmised that the source of the Sun's light was incandescence, rather than combustion.

Evidence and research
Water has been found on the Sun, and there is evidence of H2 in white dwarf stellar atmospheres.

Cooler stars include absorption band spectra that are characteristic of molecules.  Similar absorption bands are found in sun spots which are cooler areas on the Sun. Molecules found in the Sun include MgH, CaH, FeH, CrH, NaH, OH, SiH, VO, and TiO. Others include CN CH, MgF, NH, C2, SrF, zirconium monoxide, YO, ScO, BH.

Stars of most types can contain molecules, even the Ap category of A class stars. Only the hottest O, B and A class stars have no detectable molecules.  Also carbon rich white dwarfs, even though very hot, have spectral lines of  C2 and CH.

Laboratory measurements
Measurements of simple molecules that may be found in stars are performed in laboratories to determine the wavelengths of the spectra lines. Also, it is important to measure the dissociation energy and oscillator strengths (how strongly the molecule interacts with electromagnetic radiation). These measurements are inserted into formula that can calculate the spectrum under different conditions of pressure and temperature. However, man-made conditions are often different from those in stars, because it is hard to achieve the temperatures, and also local thermal equilibrium, as found in stars, is unlikely. Accuracy of oscillator strengths and actual measurement of dissociation energy is usually only approximate.

Model atmosphere
A numerical model of a star's atmosphere will calculate pressures and temperatures at different depths, and can predict the spectrum for different elemental concentrations.

Application
The molecules in stars can be used to determine some characteristics of the star. The isotopic composition can be determined if the lines in the molecular spectrum are observed. The different masses of different isotopes cause vibration and rotation frequencies to significantly vary. Secondly the temperature can be determined, as the temperature will change the numbers of molecules in the different vibrational and rotational states. Some molecules are sensitive to the ratio of elements, and so indicate elemental composition of the star. Different molecules are characteristic of different kinds of stars, and are used to classify them. Because there can be numerous spectral lines of different strength, conditions at different depths in the star can be determined. These conditions include temperature and speed towards or away from the observer. 

The spectrum of molecules has advantages over atomic spectral lines, as atomic lines are often very strong, and therefore only come from high in the atmosphere. Also the profile of the atomic spectral line can be distorted due to isotopes or overlaying of other spectral lines. The molecular spectrum is much more sensitive to temperature than atomic lines.

Detection
The following molecules have been detected in the atmospheres of stars:

See also
 Stellar chemistry

References

Astrochemistry
Molecules